Hong Kong Football Association League Cup is an annual football competition contested by clubs in the top-tier Hong Kong domestic football league (currently Hong Kong Premier League). The cup was relaunched for the 2014–15 season after being discontinued in the 2012–13 season.

Format
All teams in Hong Kong First Division League (until 2013–2014 season) / Hong Kong Premier League (starting from 2014 to 2015 season) are divided in the 2 groups (Group A & B) in first round stage. Each team plays against all other teams in the group once. The top two teams in each group qualify into the semi-finals.
In the semi-finals, the first team in Group A plays against second team in Group B while the first team in Group B plays against second team in Group A.
The winner of the semi-finals enter the final, which is usually held in Hong Kong Stadium.

Finals

Key

Results

Results by team

See also
The Hong Kong Football Association
Hong Kong First Division League

References

External links
Hong Kong Football
RSSSF.com Hong Kong - List of League Cup Finalists

 
Cup
Football cup competitions in Hong Kong
Recurring sporting events established in 2000
2000 establishments in Hong Kong